Carlisle is an unincorporated community in Otter Tail County, in the U.S. state of Minnesota.

History
Carlisle was platted in 1879. A post office was established at Carlisle in 1880, and was discontinued in 1960.

References

Unincorporated communities in Otter Tail County, Minnesota
Unincorporated communities in Minnesota